Bursut (also, Bırsud and Bursyut) is a village in the Astara Rayon of Azerbaijan.  The village forms part of the municipality of Asxanakəran.

References 

Populated places in Astara District